Kolah Kabud may refer to:
 Kolah Kabud, Ilam (كله كبود - Kolah Kabūd)
 Kolah Kabud, Kermanshah (كلاه كبود - Kolāh Kabūd)
 Kolah Kabud-e Olya, Kermanshah Province
 Kolah Kabud-e Sofla, Kermanshah Province
 Kolah Kabud-e Vosta, Kermanshah Province